"Die for You" is a song by Canadian singer the Weeknd, from his third studio album, Starboy (2016). It was written by the Weeknd, Doc McKinney, Cirkut, Prince 85, Cashmere Cat, Dylan Wiggins, and Billy Walsh, and produced by the former five. It was one of the tracks of Starboy to be featured in the short film Mania. "Die for You" received early airplay from urban and urban AC radio in August 2017, and was sent to rhythmic contemporary radio on September 19 as the album's sixth single in the United States, achieving a peak within the top 50 of the Billboard Hot 100. The song was also scheduled to be sent to US contemporary hit radio on December 5, but its release to the format in the country was cancelled for unknown reasons.

In 2022, the song experienced a resurgence in popularity, due to the online social media application TikTok. Therefore, the song impacted US radio, achieving a new peak within the top ten of the Hot 100. On February 24, 2023, the Weeknd released a remix of "Die for You" with American singer Ariana Grande, which topped the Billboard Hot 100 chart dated March 11, 2023.

Background and release
In an interview on Beats 1 Radio with Zane Lowe, the Weeknd revealed that the song was finished a week before Starboy's release. Due to the song's lyrical content, which details the conflicting feelings of ending a relationship with someone he still loves, it was the most difficult song for him to complete for the album.

The song was serviced to US rhythmic radio on September 19, 2017, as the sixth single from Starboy. Following its release as a single in North America, the song charted modestly across various Billboard component charts and became a moderate Canadian hit. "Die for You" would later then be included on the track list of the Weeknd's second greatest hits album, The Highlights, which was released on February 5, 2021.

After a resurgence in popularity thanks to TikTok in September 2021, its official music video was released on November 25, 2021, along with a standalone digital release on Apple Music with its own artwork. The song would later go on to begin receiving contemporary hit radio airplay in early August 2022 despite its cancelled release to the format in late 2017. In February 2023, the Weeknd uploaded a live performance video of the song from his After Hours til Dawn Tour to promote his HBO concert special The Weeknd: Live at SoFi Stadium. A live version of the song from his performance at SoFi Stadium was later released to digital stores and streaming platforms in March 2023 with the release of his first live album Live at SoFi Stadium.

Music and composition
"Die for You" is written in the key of C minor and has a tempo of 67 beats per minute.

Commercial performance
In the United States, "Die for You" peaked at number 43 on the Billboard Hot 100 and charted for three weeks during its original run. Additionally, the song reached number 19 on the Hot R&B/Hip-Hop Songs chart. In Canada, the song peaked at number 35 on the Canadian Hot 100 and charted for 20 weeks.

In late 2021 and throughout 2022, "Die for You" saw an increase in consumption as the song went viral on the social media platform TikTok alongside fellow album track "Stargirl Interlude". This increase in streaming and sales led to the song's parent album to re-enter the top 40 on the Billboard 200 chart. It also led to the song entering the top 40 of multiple single charts across Asia and Oceania, with the song additionally reaching number 19 on the Billboard Global 200 chart and re-entering the Billboard Hot 100, peaking at number six. On February 6, 2023, "Die for You" topped the US Radio Songs chart, over six years after its arrival on Starboy. On the same day, it also reached number one on the mainstream top 40-based US Pop Airplay chart. On both charts, "Die for You" stayed at the top for two weeks.

Following the release of the remix with Ariana Grande, the song reached the top of the Billboard Hot 100.  It became the seventh number-one hit of both The Weeknd and Grande (the latter of whom was credited on the track on the chart for the first time, as the remix drew the majority of the title's overall activity in the tracking week). It broke the record for longest climb to number one on the Hot 100 for a non-holiday song in history (over 6 years after release). Starboy became The Weeknd's third album to spawn multiple number one singles on the Hot 100, after Beauty Behind the Madness and After Hours. It also broke the record for longest wait between Hot 100 number one singles from the same album (6 years and 2 months). The Weeknd joined Michael Jackson as the only male soloists in history to have multiple number one hits on the Hot 100 from three albums. Grande surpassed Paul McCartney as the artist with the most number one duets in Hot 100 history.

Use in media
"Die for You" was featured in the second season of the HBO comedy-drama television series Insecure. Due to its appearance in the show, the song led the THR's Top TV Songs Chart in August 2017.

Music video
On November 25, 2021, to celebrate the five-year anniversary of Starboy's release, the Weeknd surprise-released the music video for "Die for You", directed by Christian Breslauer. The video pays homage to the science fiction horror television series Stranger Things and the 1982 science fiction film E.T. the Extra-Terrestrial.

Remixes

SZA remix
On October 4, 2021, an unreleased remix of "Die for You" featuring singer-songwriter SZA premiered on the eighteenth episode of the Weeknd's Apple Music 1 radio show Memento Mori, following a streaming surge the song received in September of that year. In November 2022, the Weeknd and SZA both publicly expressed interest in re-recording her verse for the remix. The two artists would later go on to discuss the matter although an official release of the remix has yet to come to fruition.

Ariana Grande remix

A remix with American singer Ariana Grande was released on February 24, 2023, alongside an accompanying lyric video uploaded to YouTube. On February 21, 2023, Grande shared a video on social media of her working on the remix, which was recorded whilst she was filming for the film adaptation of the musical Wicked. The song marks the fourth collaboration between the Weeknd and Grande, after "Love Me Harder" (2014), "Off the Table" (2020), and the remix of "Save Your Tears" (2021). The remix obtained the largest opening day streams for a remix in Spotify history with 8.9 million streams, and became both artists' seventh number one hit on the Billboard Hot 100 chart. It was later included on the deluxe edition of Starboy with its release on March 10, 2023.

Track listing
Digital / streaming single
 "Die for You" – 4:20
 "Die for You" (instrumental) – 4:19

Digital / streaming single
 "Die for You" – 4:20
 "Die for You" (music video) – 4:40

Digital / streaming single
 "Die for You" – 4:20
 "Die for You" (instrumental) – 4:19
 "Die for You" (music video) – 4:40

Digital / streaming single
 "Die for You" – 4:20
 "Die for You" (instrumental) – 4:19
 "Die for You" (sped up) – 3:43

Digital / streaming single
 "Die for You" (remix; with Ariana Grande) – 3:52

Digital single
 "Die for You" (remix instrumental; with Ariana Grande) – 4:19

Digital / streaming EP
 "Die for You" (remix; with Ariana Grande) – 3:52
 "Die for You" – 4:20
 "Die for You" (instrumental) – 4:19
 "Die for You" (sped up) – 3:43

Digital / streaming single
 "Die for You" (remix acapella; with Ariana Grande) – 3:52

Charts

Weekly charts

Year-end charts

Certifications

Release history

References

External links
 
 
 
 
 
 
 
 
 
 
 
 
 
 
 
 
 
 
 
 
 
 
 

2016 songs
2017 singles
The Weeknd songs
Songs written by Cashmere Cat
Songs written by the Weeknd
Song recordings produced by Cirkut (record producer)
Song recordings produced by Cashmere Cat
Songs written by Doc McKinney
Songs written by Cirkut (record producer)
Song recordings produced by the Weeknd
Songs written by Dylan Wiggins
2023 singles
2023 songs
Ariana Grande songs
Songs written by Ariana Grande
Republic Records singles
XO (record label) singles
Canadian synth-pop songs
American synth-pop songs
Billboard Hot 100 number-one singles
Number-one singles in the Philippines